The 1963 Detroit Lions season was their thirtieth in Detroit and 34th overall. NFL Commissioner Pete Rozelle indefinitely suspended Lions defensive tackle Alex Karras and Packers' halfback Paul Hornung for placing bets on NFL teams. Five other Lions players were fined $2,000 each for betting on games that they did not play in. The Lions franchise was fined $2,000 each on two counts for failure to report information promptly and for lack of sideline supervision. The gambling controversy proved to be a big distraction on the field as well, as the Lions could not build on the success of the previous season, finishing 5–8–1.

On Thanksgiving Day in Detroit, the Lions met the Packers for the thirteenth consecutive season. The game ended in a tie, the first for the Packers in five years, and it was the end of the holiday series for Green Bay. Their visit to Tiger Stadium the following year was on a Monday night in late September, and the visiting opponent for Thanksgiving was rotated, starting with the Chicago Bears.

Offseason

NFL Draft

Preseason

Paper Lion 

Paper Lion, published in 1966, is a non-fiction book by prominent American writer George Plimpton.
Plimpton pitched to a lineup of baseball stars in an All-Star exhibition, presumably to answer the question, "How would the average man off of the street fare in an attempt to compete with the stars of professional sports?" He chronicled this experience in his book, Out of My League. In Paper Lion, Plimpton joins the training camp of the 1963 Detroit Lions on the premise of trying out to be the team's third-string quarterback. (The coaches were aware of the deception; the players were not until it became apparent that Plimpton did not really know how to receive the snap from center.) Plimpton, then thirty-six, showed how unlikely it would be for an "average" person to succeed as a professional athlete. When finally inserted at quarterback for a series in a scrimmage conducted in Pontiac, Michigan, Plimpton managed to lose yardage on each play, convincing many in the crowd that he was a professional sports clown inserted for amusement purposes, not someone who was genuinely giving his best effort.

Regular season

Schedule 

 Saturday night (September 14), Thursday (November 28: Thanksgiving)

Game summaries

Week 1

Week 3 vs Bears

Standings

Roster

Awards and honors

Notes and references 

 Detroit Lions on Pro Football Reference
 Detroit Lions on jt-sw.com

Detroit
Detroit Lions seasons
Detroit Lions